The Kansas City Attack, previously the Atlanta Attack and later known as the Kansas City Comets, were an indoor soccer team based for most of its existence in Kansas City, Missouri. In its various incarnations the franchise played in the National Professional Soccer League from 1989–2001 and the second Major Indoor Soccer League from 2001–2005. They played their home games at the Municipal Auditorium and later Kemper Arena.

History
The franchise originated as the Atlanta Attack, which joined the American Indoor Soccer Association as an expansion team based in Atlanta, Georgia in 1989. In 1990 the league changed its name to the National Professional Soccer League. In 1991 the team relocated to Kansas City, Missouri, which had just lost its prolific Major Indoor Soccer League team, becoming the Kansas City Attack. The Attack played their first season at the Municipal Auditorium and moved into Kemper Arena in 1992.

The 1992–93 season was also the first of two national NPSL championship years for the Attack with Rookie Eddie Carmean scoring the game winning goal in the semi-final overtime to send the Attack to finals for the first time.

Kansas City was one of the more successful of the NPSL's teams, though the league itself declined in the late 1990s. In 2001 the league disbanded, and Kansas City and the NPSL's five other remaining teams formed a new league, the second Major Indoor Soccer League. At this time the team renamed itself the Kansas City Comets, after the city's original indoor soccer team. In 2005 the franchise announced that it would not play in the 2005–2006 and 2006–2007 seasons, but hoped to reform thereafter. However, the team did not reorganize by the time the second MISL folded in 2008.

In 2010, the Missouri Comets, based in nearby Independence, joined the third Major Indoor Soccer League as an expansion team, carrying on the Comets name.

Year-by-year

Honors
Championships
 1992–1993 NPSL Champions
 1996–1997 NPSL Champions

Division titles
 1995–1996 National Division
 1999–2000 Midwest Division

Head coaches
  Keith Tozer 1991–1992
 Zoran Savic 1992–1996
 Jim Schwab 1996–2000
 Zoran Savic 2000–2005

Arenas
 The Omni 1989–1991
 Municipal Auditorium 1991–1992
 Kemper Arena 1992–2005

External links
 Official Team Site

Defunct indoor soccer clubs in the United States
National Professional Soccer League (1984–2001) teams
A
Soccer clubs in Missouri
Sports in the Kansas City metropolitan area
Association football clubs established in 1989
1989 establishments in Georgia (U.S. state)
Association football clubs disestablished in 2005
2005 disestablishments in Missouri